St. John Cemetery, Cincinnati is located at 4423 Vine Street, in St. Bernard, Ohio. This Roman Catholic cemetery was founded in 1849, during a raging cholera epidemic. Many of Cincinnati's other cemeteries were already full of the victims. Many of Cincinnati's oldest German families are buried in this cemetery and the old stones are written in German.

Burials also include 25 Franciscan Friars, who were founding members of the St. John the Baptist Providence. They first came to Cincinnati in July 1844, to serve the evergrowing German population. Some of these young men were as young as 17, 20 and 21, who had left their homelands to the German-speaking Catholics.

Other burials include Clement Barnharm (1857–1935), a Cincinnati sculptor and his parents also John C. Roth a Cincinnati meat packer.

It is managed by the Cincinnati Catholic Cemetery Society.

References

 Cincinnati, a Guide to the Queen City and Its Neighbors, American Guide Series, The Weisen-Hart Press, May 1943, p. 421

External links
 
 
 

Cemeteries in Cincinnati
Roman Catholic cemeteries in Ohio
German-American history
Roman Catholic Archdiocese of Cincinnati
German-American culture in Cincinnati
1849 establishments in Ohio